The Monteregian Hills is a linear chain of isolated mountains in Montreal and Montérégie, between the Laurentians and the Appalachians.

Etymology
The first definition of the Monteregian Hills came about in 1903 when Montreal geologist Frank Dawson Adams began referring to Mount Royal (Latin, Mons Regius) and mountains of similar geology in the Saint Lawrence Lowlands as the "Royal Mountains". Other mountains in the chain included Mont Saint-Bruno, Mont Saint-Hilaire, Mont Saint-Grégoire, Mont Rougemont, Mont Yamaska, Mont Shefford, and Mont Brome.

It was only later that Mont Mégantic, the Oka Hills, as well as the Saint-André and d'Iberville formations, were added to the list.

Geology
Each mountain in the chain consists of an erosional remnant of Cretaceous intrusive igneous rock and associated hornfels, which are more resistant to weathering than the surrounding sedimentary rock. All of the mountains have dark-coloured mafic rock such as gabbro and essexite; some also have large areas of pulaskite, syenite, and other light-coloured rock.

The Monteregian Hills are part of the Great Meteor hotspot track, formed as a result of the North American Plate sliding westward over the long-lived New England hotspot, and are the eroded remnants of intrusive stocks. These intrusive stocks have been variously interpreted as the feeder intrusions of long extinct volcanoes, which would have been active about 125 million years ago, or as intrusives that never breached the surface in volcanic activity. The lack of an obvious track west of the Monteregian Hills may be due either to failure of the plume to penetrate the Canadian Shield, to the lack of recognizable intrusions, or to strengthening of the plume when it approached the Monteregian Hills region. However, there is evidence the hotspot track extends northwestwards, including epeirogenic uplift, mantle velocity anomalies and kimberlitic volcanic features (e.g. the Attawapiskat, Kirkland Lake and Lake Timiskaming kimberlite fields) that become older away from the Monteregian Hills.

The shallow, rocky sandy loam soils of the summits are mostly covered in forest. Where the underlying rock is rich in olivine, as over large areas of Mont Saint-Bruno and Mont Rougemont, these soils are classed as dystric brunisol. Podzol tends to develop over rock which lacks olivine, although many of these podzols lack an eluvial (Ae) horizon. Lower slopes are covered with aprons of gravel or sand. The sandy soils are usually podzols with classic Ae development; they often have subsoil hardpan and are undesirable for agriculture. The free-draining gravels are preferred for apple orchards, which grow in thermal belts where cold air can drain to the valley floor.

Gallery

See also
Volcanism of Canada
Volcanism of Eastern Canada

External links

  Les collines montérégiennes Geologic information about the chain

References

Mountain ranges of Quebec
Mountains of Quebec
Cretaceous volcanism
Igneous petrology of Quebec
Landforms of Montérégie